In Canada, the 1950 Governor General's Awards for Literary Merit were the fourteenth such awards.  The awards in this period had no monetary prize but were an honour for the authors.

Winners
Fiction: Germaine Guèvremont, The Outlander .
Poetry or Drama: James Wreford Watson, Of Time and the Lover.
Non-Fiction: Marjorie Wilkins Campbell, The Saskatchewan.
Non-Fiction: W. L. Morton, The Progressive Party in Canada.
Juvenile: Donalda Dickie, The Great Adventure.

Governor General's Awards
Governor General's Awards
Governor General's Awards